Baunatal is a station on Line 10 of the Madrid Metro. It is located in fare Zone B1.

The station was named after the Avenida de Baunatal, which in turn got its name from the Hessian town of Baunatal, a sister city of San Sebastián de los Reyes since 1990.

References 

Line 10 (Madrid Metro) stations
Railway stations in Spain opened in 2007
San Sebastián de los Reyes